Lapšina is a village in northern Croatia, part of the Sveti Martin na Muri municipality within Međimurje County.

History
Lapšina is mentioned in charter issued in year 1478 as Lapsthin. In the late 16th century, the nobleman Nicolaus Malakoczy built a castle in Lapšina. The castle fell into disrepair during 19th century and by the 1930s it was completely demolished.

Geography

Lapšina is located in part of Međimurje called Gornje Međimurje. Lapšina is about 21 kilometres northwest from Čakovec. Village is situated on the right bank of river Mur near border with Slovenia.
Lapšina had a population of 148 in 2011 census. Lapšina is experiencing population decline since 2000s.

References

Populated places in Međimurje County